Hursthouse may refer to:

 Charles Flinders Hursthouse (1817–1876), New Zealand settler, writer
 Charles Wilson Hursthouse (1841–1911), New Zealand surveyor, public servant, politician, soldier
 Richmond Hursthouse (1845–1902), New Zealand politician
 Rosalind Hursthouse (born 1943), New Zealand moral philosopher